Jeffrey Chetcuti (born 22 April 1974 in Malta) is a professional footballer currently playing for Maltese First Division side Gżira United, where he plays as a defender.
2020 charged in court for money  laundering.

External links
 Jeffrey Chetcuti at MaltaFootball.com 
 

Living people
1974 births
Maltese footballers
Malta international footballers
Mosta F.C. players
Valletta F.C. players
Sliema Wanderers F.C. players
Vittoriosa Stars F.C. players
Gżira United F.C. players
St. Andrews F.C. players
Association football defenders